Karl Ludwig Bruno Seidler-Winkler (18 July 1880 – 19 October 1960) was a German conductor, pianist and music arranger.

Life 
Seidler-Winkler was born in Berlin as the son of a musician and already made his musical appearance in his youth. He received his first training at the Stern Conservatory at the piano with Ernst Jedliczka. He sang in the choir of the Berliner Dom. At the age of ten he also played the violin and was considered a gifted pianist; four years later he conducted in a small theatre in Berlin. As the artistic recording director of the German Edison company, he became acquainted with and mastered the possibilities of sound recording as early as the 1890s.

He was then able to contribute his experience to the newly founded Deutsche Grammophon label. From 1903 to 1923 he was their artistic director and responsible for a large number of sound recordings. He directed recordings of the opera ensembles of Berlin, Dresden, Munich, and Vienna and organized the necessary recording facilities and rooms. The acoustic recording technique used in the first years of recording was associated with many technical problems and limitations. Bruno Seidler-Winkler's arrangements, however, were already extraordinarily effective in achieving the desired effect for the individual composers. He was one of the first house conductors to lead the Deutsche Grammophon Orchestra. Thus, in 1908, the first complete recording of the opera Carmen by Georges Bizet was made under his direction (with Ema Destinová in the leading role) and in 1923, when he left Deutsche Grammophon, the first complete recording of the 9th Symphony by Beethoven. He was also active as a conductor from 1903 to 1932.

He also accompanied recordings of well-known artists - singers and instrumentalists - as a pianist. Numerous recordings have been preserved that were made with the singer Otto Reutter, from 1902 until shortly after the First World War; as well as with Váša Příhoda. From the beginning of the 1930s he was engaged at the Universität der Künste Berlin in the training of young artists for the musical design of radio programmes. In 1938 he was involved in a first electric recording of the opera Die Walküre by Richard Wagner, which had been planned since the beginning of the 1930s and then begun in 1935 in Vienna by Bruno Walter and the Wiener Symphoniker. The missing parts of the second act were recorded under his direction in Berlin for Electrola (His Master's Voice). Also in 1938 he accompanied the young French violinist Ginette Neveu on her first recordings.

His repertoire included classical music as well as light music such as operettas, chansons, and hits. He arranged the recording of the song "Lili Marleen" with Lale Andersen in 1939. He also conducted the instrumental ensemble that accompanied the recording.

In 1913 he became a member of the Berlin masonic lodge Zum Widder. The soprano Brigitta Seidler-Winkler, born in 1936,  is his daughter.

A few months before his death he was awarded the Bundesverdienstkreuz in 1960.

Seidler-Winkler died in Berlin at age 80. He was buried in the state-owned cemetery  in Spandau (Berlin).

References

External links 
 
 Bruno Seidler-Winkler on Allmusic
 
 Seidler-Winkler on Filmportal
 Bruno Seidler-Winkler on Allmusic
 PODIUM LEGENA (www.podium-wendel.de) POL-1018 und POL-1026 with recordings and documentaries about Váša Příhoda and Seidler-Winkler.

External links 
 

German male conductors (music)
German classical pianists
Male classical pianists
German music arrangers
Recipients of the Order of Merit of the Federal Republic of Germany
German Freemasons
1880 births
1960 deaths
Musicians from Berlin
20th-century German male musicians